(April 7, 1969 – June 15, 2010) was a Japanese manga artist and manga gensakusha from Ehime Prefecture. He is best known for writing the manga Alive -Saishū Shinkateki Shōnen-.

Career
Kawashima made his professional debut with Daughter Maker, which ran in Kōdansha's Monthly Shōnen Magazine Zōkan Great. From October 2003 to October 2009, Kawashima collaborated with Adachitoka to create Alive -Saishū Shinkateki Shōnen-, which was published in Kōdansha's Monthly Shōnen Magazine. Kawashima succumbed to liver cancer on June 15, 2010, and died at the age of 41, having finished Alive on his deathbed.

Bibliography
 Daughter Maker (2000–2001 Kodansha)
  (2003–2010 Kodansha); English translation: Alive: The Final Evolution (2008— Del Rey Manga)

References

External links
 Shion - Homepage

1969 births
2010 deaths
Manga artists from Ehime Prefecture
Deaths from liver cancer